The Research Turtles, also known as The Flamethrowers, is an indie band from Louisiana, who are known for southern rock Brit pop. They were formed in 2004 and have toured as both The Research Turtles and The Flamethrowers.

History

The Research Turtles were formed in 2004 by Jud Norman. The name Research Turtles was taken from the Wes Anderson Movie The Life Aquatic with Steve Zissou. At that time, Norman formed the band to perform on his solo album Apples, Oranges. The original band consisted of members Jud Norman on vocals and bass, Joseph Darbonne on vocals and lead guitar, Paul Gonsoulin on vocals and rhythm, and Blake Thibodeaux on drums. Darbonne and Gonsoulin left the band in 2008 and were replaced by Joe Norman (Jud's younger brother) and Logan Fontenot. In 2009, Joe Norman left the band and was replaced by former member Darbonne and in 2010 Thibodeaux was replaced by drummer Chad Townsend.

The band has released a total of four albums including the solo album of Jud Norman. In 2010, the song "Let’s Get Carried Away" from their self-titled album, was awarded the International Song of the Year by BBC Radio 6 Music. The Research Turtles have toured under their current name as well as The Flamethrowers. In addition to playing their own shows, they have opened up for such acts as Toad the Wet Sprocket, Sister Hazel, and Candlebox.

Discography

See also
Independent music

References

External links
Research Turtles Homepage

Musical groups established in 2004
English indie rock groups